Michiel Huisman (born 18 July 1981) is a Dutch actor who has acted in both Dutch and English-language TV series and films. 

Huisman began his career in the Dutch soap opera Goede tijden, slechte tijden (1998). He later played in the Dutch films Costa! (2001), Full Moon Party (2002), Phileine Says Sorry (2003), Floris (2004) and Black Book (2006), and in the Dutch TV series De co-assistent (2007–10) and Bloedverwanten (2010). During the early years of his acting career, Huisman was also part of a band called Fontane.

Huisman's first international acting experience came in 2006, when he guest-starred in an episode of the British TV series Dalziel and Pascoe. He subsequently appeared in The Young Victoria (2009), Treme (2010–13), Nashville (2012–14), World War Z (2013), Wild (2014), Orphan Black (2014–15), Game of Thrones (2014–16), The Invitation (2015), The Age of Adaline (2015), The Haunting of Hill House (2018), The Guernsey Literary and Potato Peel Pie Society (2018) and The Flight Attendant (2020). In 2022, he starred in the black ops military series Echo 3.

Personal life 
Huisman was born in Amstelveen. He is the brother of former professional football player Dustin Huisman.  Huisman is fond of table tennis, which he has played since childhood. He was raised Jewish.

Huisman is married to Dutch actress Tara Elders, and they have a daughter who was born in 2007. The couple formerly lived in New Orleans, Louisiana, US; and now reside in New York City.

Career

Music career 
Huisman was singer and guitarist in the Dutch band Fontane, which he formed together with Roland van der Hoofd, Gilles Tuinder, Bas van Geldere, and Donny Griffioen. The band released the singles "1+1=2" (2001), "Slapeloos" (2002), and "Neem Me Mee" (2003). The first single was on the soundtrack of the film Costa! (2001) and the second was on the soundtrack of Full Moon Party (2002), both in which Huisman played a starring role. The band also recorded a version of Willeke Alberti's song "Telkens weer" for the soundtrack of the movie Love to Love (2003).

After two members left the band, Fontane split up and Huisman decided to pursue music on his own. Huisman released the singles "Deel Van Mij" (2005) and "Geef Je Over" (2006), and the album Luchtige Verhalen (2005) as a solo artist. Huisman said in interview about his solo career: "It doesn't feel like a new start, but as if I've started just now." and "It is personal and closerby. Also the sound of the album."

Acting career 
Huisman began his acting career with a supporting role on Goede Tijden, Slechte Tijden – the longest-running soap opera on Dutch television – where he played Rover, a 14-year-old model who accuses his employers of engaging in child pornography.   He was then cast in the made-for-TV films Suzy Q  and Uitgesloten.

He played supporting roles in the Dutch films Costa! and Volle Maan, both of which were directed by Johan Nijenhuis and aimed at a teen-aged audience. At the same time, he also had a recurring role on the Dutch police series Spangen. Huisman moved into leading-man territory in 2003 with the film Phileine Says Sorry, which was an adaptation of Ronald Giphart's book of the same title. He also starred as medieval knight Floris in the film Floris, based on the Dutch TV series.

In the years that followed he played a leading role in the football comedy Johan, recurring guest roles in the comedy series Meiden van De Wit and the first season of the drama series Bloedverwanten, and the leading role in the medical drama series De Co-Assistent. He also played a small supporting role in the 2006 film Zwartboek by Paul Verhoeven, which became the most successful Dutch film of all time.

In 2006, Huisman made his first foray into the international acting world with a supporting role in an episode of the British TV series Dalziel and Pascoe. He followed this with a role as Ernest II, Duke of Saxe-Coburg and Gotha in The Young Victoria, and the BBC made-for-TV drama Margot in which he portrayed Rudolf Nureyev.
He then joined the main cast of the HBO series Treme, as Sonny, a Dutch busker who plays keyboards and guitar. He was taught New Orleans piano by Davis Rogan. During his time on Treme, Huisman also played a small supporting role in the apocalyptic action film World War Z and started recurring as Liam McGuinnis on Nashville.

Huisman replaced English actor Ed Skrein in the role of Daario Naharis for the fourth season (2014) of Game of Thrones. Huisman was promoted to series regular for the fifth season (2015) of the series. Huisman also recurred on seasons 2 and 3 of Orphan Black, portraying Cal Morrison, a rugged outdoorsman who crosses paths with the clones.

In 2014, Huisman appeared in the Academy Award-nominated biographical drama film Wild and starred in the advertising campaign for Chanel No.5's The One That I Want, which was directed by Baz Luhrmann. In 2015, Huisman co-starred in the thriller The Invitation, and played the leading role in the fantasy romance film The Age of Adaline.

In 2016, Huisman was cast as the lead role in the war-drama The Ottoman Lieutenant which tells the story of a Turkish officer (Huisman) who falls in love with an idealistic American nurse, played by Hera Hilmar, during World War I. The film also stars Josh Hartnett and Ben Kingsley. The film was released for an Oscar-qualifying run in December 2016 before wide release in March 2017.

Also in 2016, Huisman played Walter Davidson in the Discovery Channel limited series Harley and the Davidsons which told the origin story of Harley-Davidson Inc. The three-part series premiered in September 2016 and gained reasonable reviews from critics and from Harley-Davidson themselves.

Huisman starred in the thriller film 2:22 which was released on 30 June 2017. That year, Huisman was cast as Sam, the male lead in the romantic drama Irreplaceable You. The film co-starred Gugu Mbatha-Raw as his childhood sweetheart, and later fiancée, who is diagnosed with terminal cancer, and Steve Coogan and Christopher Walken also appear. The film was released on 16 February 2018 on Netflix and has a Rotten Tomatoes rating of 33% Fresh. Also in 2018, Huisman starred opposite Lily James as Dawsey Adams, the male lead in the romantic drama The Guernsey Literary and Potato Peel Pie Society, based on the 2008 novel of the same name.

In 2018, Huisman starred in the Netflix horror series The Haunting of Hill House, which is based on Shirley Jackson's 1959 novel of the same name. The 10-episode drama, released on 12 October 2018, is a modern re-imagining of the original story, now about a family of seven. Huisman plays Steven Crain, the oldest sibling, who becomes a published writer of supernatural books, including a memoir about his family's time living at Hill House. Mike Flanagan wrote, directed and executive-produced the series. In 2019, Huisman had a lead role in the Netflix film The Red Sea Diving Resort, as an Israeli agent.

Discography 

Singles with Fontane
 "1+1=2" (2001)
 "Slapeloos" (2002)
 "Neem Me Mee" (2003)

Solo singles
 "Deel Van Mij" (2005)
 "Geef Je Over" (2006)

Solo albums
 Luchtige Verhalen (2005)

Filmography

Film

Television

References

External links 

 
 
 

1981 births
20th-century Dutch male actors
21st-century Dutch male actors
Dutch expatriates in the United States
Dutch male child actors
Dutch male film actors
Dutch male television actors
Dutch musicians
Dutch Jews
Living people
People from Amstelveen